Ingrid Holásková, née Spieglová, (born 6 August 1960) is a former pair skater for Czechoslovakia. With Alan Spiegl, she won six national titles and competed at the 1976 Winter Olympics.

Personal life 
Ingrid Spieglová was born on 6 August 1960 in Opava, Czechoslovakia. She is the sister of Alan Spiegl. In 1984, she graduated from Masaryk University in Brno, having studied at the Faculty of Education.

Career 
In 1973, Spieglová and her brother moved from Opava to Brno, where they became students of Ivan Rezek. The siblings represented Czechoslovakia in pair skating and won six consecutive national titles, beginning in the 1974–75 season. Their ISU Championship debut came at the 1975 Europeans in Copenhagen, Denmark; the pair finished 12th at the event.

The following season, Spieglová/Spiegl ranked 12th at the 1976 European Championships in Geneva, Switzerland, and then 13th at the 1976 Winter Olympics in Innsbruck, Austria. Concluding their season, they placed 10th at the 1976 World Championships in Gothenburg, Sweden.

The siblings achieved their career-best world result, 6th, at the 1977 World Championships in Tokyo, Japan, and 1978 World Championships in Ottawa, Canada. Their highest continental result, 5th, came at the 1978 European Championships in Strasbourg, France.

Spieglová/Spiegl won silver at the 1977 Golden Spin of Zagreb, silver at the 1978 Prague Skate, bronze at the 1979 Ennia Challenge Cup, and silver at the 1979 Prague Skate. They were scheduled to compete at the 1980 Winter Olympics in Lake Placid, New York, but the Communists decided to give their spot to someone else. The siblings retired from competition at the end of the season. They skated with Holiday on Ice for seven years.

Competitive highlights 
With Alan Spiegl

References 

1960 births
Czechoslovak female pair skaters
Figure skaters at the 1976 Winter Olympics
Living people
Olympic figure skaters of Czechoslovakia
Sportspeople from Opava